Thoas may refer to several figures in Greek mythology:
Thoas (king of Lemnos), saved by his daughter Hypsipyle from the massacre by the Lemnian women, a son of Dionysus and Ariadne, sometimes identified with Thoas (king of the Taurians) below
Thoas (king of the Taurians), king when Iphigenia became priestess of Artimis, sometimes identified with Thoas (king of Lemnos) above
Thoas (king of Aetolia), a Greek hero and leader in the Trojan War, son of Andraemon and Gorge
Thoas (king of Corinth), a son of Ornytion and a grandson of Sisyphus
Thoas (son of Jason and Hypsipyle), a son of Jason, the leader of the Argonauts, and Hypsipyle the daughter of Thoas, the king of Lemnos (above), and the brother of Euneus
Thoas (mythology), other figures named "Thoas" in Greek mythology

Thoas may also refer to:
 4834 Thoas, an asteroid named after the Greek mythological Trojan War hero
 An ancient name of the Achelous River